A round in a cryptographic context is a basic transformation that is repeated multiple times inside the algorithm. The reason behind the splitting of a large algorithmic function into rounds is simplification of both the implementation and the cryptanalysisst.

Typically rounds  are implemented using the same function parameterized by the round constant and, for block ciphers, the round key from the key schedule. This parameterization is essential to reduce the self-similarity of the cipher that can lead to slide attacks.

Increasing the number of rounds can help protect against differential and linear cryptanalysis, as for these tools the effort grows exponentially with the number of rounds. However, simply increasing the number of rounds does not necessarily make weak ciphers into strong ones, as some attacks do not depend on the number of rounds.

Round constants 
Inserting round-dependent constants into the encryption process breaks the symmetry between rounds and thus thwarts the most obvious slide attacks. The technique is a standard feature of most modern block ciphers. However, the poor choice of the round constants or unintended interrelations between the constants and other cipher components still allows slide attacks through this countermeasure (e.g., the an attack on the initial version of the format-preserving encryption mode FF3).

Many lightweight ciphers utilize very simple key scheduling where the round keys are obtained by adding the round constants to the encryption key. The poor choice of round constants in this case might make the cipher vulnerable to invariant attacks (broken ciphers include SCREAM and Midori64).

References

Sources
 
 
 
 

Cryptographic primitives